Timothy Jermaine Bowers (born January 9, 1982) is a former American professional basketball player. He was named the 2006 Israeli Basketball Premier League MVP. At 6' 2", he is capable of playing both guard positions.

Early life
He grew up in Gulfport, Mississippi where he graduated from Harrison Central High School. He studied at Mississippi State University and signed up for the 2004 NBA Draft after graduation. He was not drafted.

Career
After the NBA Draft he tried his luck playing with the Los Angeles Lakers Summer League Team and then moved on to the Asheville Altitude from the NBDL (now NBA G League), winning the 2004–2005 NBDL Championship. At season’s end, he signed on to play with the Phoenix Suns in the NBA Summer League, after which he chose to continue his career abroad.

Then he decided to play in Israel, after signing with Maccabi Giv'at Shmuel, and became the league top scorer after averaging 21.8 ppg, 5.3 rpg, and 3.6 apg in the 2005–2006 season. He was named the 2006 Israeli Basketball Premier League MVP.

In 2006/07 and 2007/08 he won the Israeli state cup with Hapoel Jerusalem.

In February 2015, he signed with Koroivos Amaliadas of the Greek Basket League. Bowers spent the 2017–18 season with Pallacanestro Biella and posted 13.1 points, 4.9 rebounds and 3.5 assists per game. He signed with the Serie A2 club Andrea Costa Imola on July 18, 2018.

References

External links
Legabasket.it Profile

1982 births
Living people
African-American basketball players
American expatriate basketball people in Greece
American expatriate basketball people in Israel
American expatriate basketball people in Italy
American men's basketball players
Andrea Costa Imola players
Asheville Altitude players
Auxilium Pallacanestro Torino players
Basket Ferentino players
Basketball players from Milwaukee
Hapoel Jerusalem B.C. players
Israeli Basketball Premier League players
Juvecaserta Basket players
Koroivos B.C. players
Maccabi Givat Shmuel players
Mississippi State Bulldogs men's basketball players
Pallacanestro Biella players
Reyer Venezia players
Shooting guards
Sportspeople from Gulfport, Mississippi
21st-century African-American sportspeople
20th-century African-American people